Jean Thierry Lazare Amani (born 7 March 1998) is an Ivorian professional footballer who plays for Belgian First Division A club Union Saint-Gilloise, and the Ivory Coast national team as a central midfielder.

Club career
On 22 June 2021, he joined Union Saint-Gilloise on a season-long loan. On 20 April 2022, Union SG exercised their option to make the transfer permanent and signed a three-year contract with Amani.

Career statistics

International career
Lazare represented the Ivory Coast national under-20 football team at the 2017 Toulon Tournament.

Lazare made his debut for Ivory Coast national football team in a 4-0 win over Burundi, on 16th November 2022.

Honours
Ivory Coast U23
Africa U-23 Cup of Nations runner-up:2019

Individual
Toulon Tournament Best XI: 2017
Toulon Tournament Bronze Ball: 2017

References

1998 births
Living people
People from Gôh-Djiboua District
Ivorian footballers
Ivorian expatriate footballers
Ivory Coast under-20 international footballers
Belgian Pro League players
Liga Portugal 2 players
Aspire Academy (Senegal) players
K.A.S. Eupen players
R. Charleroi S.C. players
G.D. Estoril Praia players
Royale Union Saint-Gilloise players
Association football midfielders
Ivorian expatriate sportspeople in Belgium
Ivorian expatriate sportspeople in Portugal
Expatriate footballers in Belgium
Expatriate footballers in Portugal